James Russell Sweeney II (born 1961) is a United States district judge of the United States District Court for the Southern District of Indiana.

Biography 

Sweeney received a Bachelor of Science, with merit, in 1983 from the United States Naval Academy. From 1983 to 1992 Sweeney was an active duty Naval Flight Officer in the United States Marine Corps. He received a Juris Doctor, magna cum laude, in 1996 from Notre Dame Law School. Sweeney then clerked for Judge John Daniel Tinder of the United States District Court for the Southern District of Indiana and Judge James L. Ryan of the United States Court of Appeals for the Sixth Circuit. In 1999, Sweeney joined the law firm Barnes & Thornburg, where he practiced corporate law until becoming a judge in 2018.

Federal judicial service 

His nomination was announced and sent to the Senate on November 1, 2017. President Trump nominated Sweeney to the seat on the United States District Court for the Southern District of Indiana vacated by Judge Sarah Evans Barker, who assumed senior status on June 30, 2014. A hearing on his nomination before the Senate Judiciary Committee was held on January 10, 2018. On February 8, 2018, the Judiciary Committee voted to report his nomination by voice vote. On August 28, 2018, his nomination was confirmed by voice vote. He received his judicial commission on September 13, 2018.

References

External links 
 
 

1961 births
Living people
20th-century American lawyers
21st-century American lawyers
21st-century American judges
United States Marine Corps personnel of the Gulf War
Indiana lawyers
Judges of the United States District Court for the Southern District of Indiana
Notre Dame Law School alumni
People from Indianapolis
Recipients of the Air Medal
Recipients of the Defense Superior Service Medal
Recipients of the Legion of Merit
United States district court judges appointed by Donald Trump
United States Marine Corps colonels
United States Naval Academy alumni